The black-eyed gecko (Mokopirirakau kahutarae), also known commonly as Whitaker's sticky-toed gecko, is a species of lizard in the family Diplodactylidae. An alpine gecko species, discovered in 1970, it inhabits high-altitude mountains in three areas of the South Island of New Zealand.

Description
The black-eyed gecko is a medium-sized lizard, olive or grey above and white below, with 6–7 lighter bands across the dorsal surface of its body, and speckled sides. It has very small body scales and narrow tapering toes, which more closely resemble those of an arboreal than a terrestrial gecko. It is most notable for its prominent eyebrows and unusually jet-black irises – all other related geckos have a light iris with a filigree pattern. When handled it makes chirruping calls or squeals.

Behaviour
M. kahutarae is nocturnal and can be active at temperatures as low as 7℃. It sun-basks on boulders at the entrance to its retreat, but is very wary and flees rapidly if disturbed.

Taxonomy
Initially classified in the genus Hoplodactylus, the black-eyed gecko is now placed in the genus Mokopirirakau along with other narrow-toed alpine and forest geckos. The holotype specimen is in the collection of the Museum of New Zealand Te Papa Tongarewa.

Geographic range

The first specimen of M. kahutarae collected was found in March 1970 in a colony of Hutton's shearwaters on Mt Tarahaka in the Seaward Kaikoura Range. The specific epithet, kahutarae, is taken from the place where the type specimen was found.

It is able to survive in the sub-nival zone, where vegetation is patchy and snow-covered in winter.

It is possible that this species is not especially adapted to an alpine habit; rocks and bluffs may be its last retreat from the rats and mice common at lower altitudes.

Conservation status
In 2012 the Department of Conservation (DOC) classified M. kahutarae as Nationally Vulnerable under the New Zealand Threat Classification System. This was based on it existing in just a few subpopulations, the largest of less than 500 individuals, predicted to decline. It was noted as being data-poor, and sparsely distributed with a restricted range.

See also
Geckos of New Zealand

References

External links
 Alpine geckos discussed on Radio NZ Critter of the Week,15 July 2016

Reptiles of New Zealand
Mokopirirakau
Reptiles described in 1985
Taxa named by Anthony Whitaker
Taxonomy articles created by Polbot